"Interstellar Love" may refer to:

"Interstellar Love", song by Paola Bruna from Stockcity Girl
"Interstellar Love", song by Thundercat from It Is What It Is (Thundercat album) 2020
"Interstellar Love", song by The Avalanches from We Will Always Love You
"Interstellar Love Song" song by Delicate Flowers from Die Progress Unit I